HD 82943 (164 G. Hydrae) is a yellow dwarf star approximately 89 light-years away in the constellation of Hydra.  Two extrasolar planets have been confirmed to be orbiting it,  and it is thought that the system had more giant planets that were "swallowed" by the parent star. HD 82943 is estimated at 1.15 times the mass of the Sun.

Planetary system 

The first planet discovered (designated HD 82943 b) was announced in 2000 by a team of French astronomers led by Michel Mayor.  The planet orbits its parent star at a mean distance of 1.19 astronomical units (AU) and taking approximately 441 days to complete the orbit.  Nearly a year later, a second planet (designated HD 82943 c) was announced by the same discoverers of the previous planet.  This planet orbits closer than the other, at a mean distance of 0.746 AU and taking 219 days to complete its orbit. The two known planets appear to have a 2:1 resonance with one another. Further radial velocity analysis hinted at either long-period stellar activity or presence of a third Jovian planet with an orbital period of 1075 days.

Announced in 2001, HD 82943 was found to contain an unusually high amount of lithium-6.  Stars do not naturally contain lithium-6, but unlike stars, planets never reach temperatures that are high enough to burn their initial content of lithium-6 (planets should retain lithium-6).  The simplest and most convincing answer to explain this observation is that one or more planets, or at least planetary material, have fallen into the star, sometime after it passed through its early evolutionary stage.

See also 
 Gliese 876
 HD 169830
 Mu Arae

References

External links 
 
 
 
 Extrasolar Planet Interactions by Rory Barnes & Richard Greenberg, Lunar and Planetary Lab, University of Arizona

F-type main-sequence stars
082943
047007
Hydra (constellation)
Planetary systems with two confirmed planets
Durchmusterung objects